Berdmore Compton (1820–1908) was an English Anglican priest most distinguished as vicar of All Saints, Margaret Street, from 1873 to 1886. Following education at Merton College, Oxford, he served as Rector of Barford, near Warwick, until beginning work at St Paul's, Covent Garden from 1865 to 1873. He began service at Margaret Street in 1873 and continued until 1886. At his death in 1907, he was a prebendary of St Paul's Cathedral.

External links 
 
 Bibliographic directory from Project Canterbury

1820 births
1908 deaths
19th-century English Anglican priests
19th-century English theologians
Alumni of Merton College, Oxford
Anglo-Catholic clergy
Anglo-Catholic theologians
English Anglican theologians
English Anglo-Catholics